Herbert Weißbach (12 November 1901 – 13 October 1995) was a German actor, cabaret artist, and voice actor. Born in Bernburg, he appeared in more than 240 films and television shows between 1935 and 1994.

Selected filmography

 Donogoo Tonka (1936)
 Orders Are Orders (1936)
 I Love You (1938)
 The Great and the Little Love (1938)
 Travelling People (1938)
 You and I (1938)
 Nanon (1938)
 Target in the Clouds (1939)
 Detours to Happiness (1939)
 Madame Butterfly (1939)
 Between Hamburg and Haiti (1940)
 Everything for Gloria (1941)
 Love Me (1942)
 Romance in a Minor Key (1943)
 The Woman of My Dreams (1944)
 Don't Play with Love (1949)
 The Great Mandarin (1949)
 The Cuckoos (1949)
  Dutch Girl (1953)
 The Uncle from America (1953)
  Knall and Fall as Detectives (1953)
  Son Without a Home (1955)
 Heroism after Hours (1955)
 Black Forest Melody (1956)
 The Simple Girl (1957)
 The Count of Luxemburg (1957)
 Tired Theodore (1957)
 The Mad Bomberg (1957)
 And That on Monday Morning (1959)
 Peter Shoots Down the Bird (1959)
 A Glass of Water (1960)
 We Cellar Children (1960)
 Freddy and the Melody of the Night (1960)
 Bankraub in der Rue Latour (1961)
 The Marriage of Mr. Mississippi (1961)
 The Liar (1961)
 Dead Woman from Beverly Hills (1964)
 Zur Hölle mit den Paukern (1968)
 Zero Hour (1977)

References

External links

1901 births
1995 deaths
People from Bernburg
People from the Duchy of Anhalt
German male film actors
20th-century German male actors